The women's 3000 metres at the 1990 Asian Winter Games was held on 12 March 1990 in Sapporo, Japan.

Records

Results
Legend
DSQ — Disqualified

References
Results

External links
Changchun 2007 Official website

Women 3000